Henri Schoeman (born 22 April 1983 in Zutphen) is a Dutch former judoka.  At the 2005 International Judo Federation world championships in Cairo he finished fifth in the -73 kg division. He won his first 4 matches and lost in the semi-finals and repechage.

Since retiring from active judo, he teaches physical education and coaches judo.

Achievements

References

1983 births
Living people
Dutch male judoka
People from Zutphen
Sportspeople from Gelderland
21st-century Dutch people